Paolo Giglio (20 January 1927 – 6 March 2016) was a Maltese prelate of the Catholic Church, who worked in the diplomatic service of the Holy See from 1958 to 2002, with the rank of archbishop and nuncio from 1986.

Biography 
Paolo Giglio was born in Valletta, Malta, on 20 January 1927 to Angelo Giglio and Ludgarda nee Borg. After studying at the local seminary, he earned a licenciate in theology and a doctorate in canon law at the Pontifical Gregorian University. He was ordained to the priesthood in 12 April 1952.

In preparation for a diplomat's career, he completed the course of study at the Pontifical Ecclesiastical Academy in 1956. He was secretary at the Holy See's missions in Nicaragua (1958–59), Argentina (1960–62), and Iran (1963–65); auditor in Vietnam (1966–68) and Yugoslavia (1969-70); counsellor in the United States (1971–72) and Brazil (1973–75); counsellor and deputy head of mission in France (1976–77); and chargé d’affaires in Taiwan (1978–86).

On 4 April 1986 Pope John Paul II named him titular archbishop of Tyndaris and Apostolic Nuncio to Nicaragua.

He was named Apostolic Nunzio to Egypt on 25 March 1995.
On 8 February 2000, he was named Apostolic Delegate to the League of Arab States as well.

Giglio retired on 5 February 2002 when he was replaced as nuncio to Egypt by Marco Dino Brogi.

He died on 6 March 2016.

References

1927 births
2016 deaths
Maltese Roman Catholic archbishops
Apostolic Nuncios to Nicaragua
Apostolic Nuncios to Egypt
Apostolic Nuncios to the Arab League
People from Valletta